Jasin–NSE Highway is a dual-carriageway highway in Malacca State, Malaysia. It is also a main route to North–South Expressway Southern Route via Jasin Interchange.

List of interchanges

Highways in Malaysia
Roads in Malacca

References